Examilia is a town in the municipality of Corinth, Greece. It is situated about 5 km south of Corinth, and 6 km west of Kechries (ancient Cenchreae).

History 
The town was first attested in 1676 by French archaeologist Jacob Spon as an Albanian (Arvanite) village. In present times only few of the inhabitants are still able to speak Arvanitika.
According to the inhabitants of the town they are descended from Albanian settlers that arrived in Corinth earlier than the ones of Xylokeriza. Based on Spon and Francis Wheler modern historians assume that the ancestors of Examilians had settled the area at least since the late 17th century. Examilians have been reported to not always be in good terms with the inhabitants of Xylokeriza. According to some scholars the source of these local differences is that Examilians descend from earlier settlers than the ones of Xylokeriza.

Demographics

Other
The population also has Romani minority. On February 18, 2000, clashes occurred with four police officers and the minorities.

Sources

External links 
GTP - Examilia

See also
List of settlements in Corinthia

Arvanite settlements
Populated places in Corinthia
Saronic Gulf